Xiaohe  is a township-level division situated in Shitai County, Chizhou, Anhui, China.

See also
List of township-level divisions of Anhui

References

Towns in Anhui
Chizhou